Burdine Township is a township in Texas County, in the U.S. state of Missouri.

Burdine Township was erected in 1858, taking its name from Reuben Burdine, a pioneer citizen.

References

Townships in Missouri
Townships in Texas County, Missouri